Hypodynerus is a South American, primarily Andean, genus of potter wasps with most of its described species inhabiting Chile. The species included in Hypodynerus include:

Species

H. akros Willink, 1970
H. albocinctus (Puls, 1868)
H. andeus (Packer, 1869)
H. antucensis (Saussure, 1855)
H. antuco (Saussure, 1852)
H. arechavaletae Brèthes, 1903
H. brethesi Jörgensen, 1912
H. bruchii Brèthes, 1903
H. caupolicans (Reed, 1893)
H. Cerberus Bequaert & Ruiz, 1941
H. chiliensis (Lepeletier, 1841)
H. chiliotus Saussure, 1852
H. coarctatus (Saussure, 1852)
H. colocolo (Saussure, 1852)
H. dimidiaticornis (Zavattari, 1912)
H. duckei (Berton, 1918)
H. excipiendus (Spinola, 1851)
H. foersteri Giordani Soika, 1961
H. fuscipennis Brèthes, 1903
H. heptagonalis Brèthes, 1903
H. houssayi Willink, 1981
H. huancabambae Schrottky, 1911
H. humeralis (Haliday, 1837)
H. joergenseni Schrottky, 1909
H. labiatus (Haliday, 1837)
H. lachensis (Lepeletier, 1841)
H. mapochu Gribodo, 1894
H. maypinus (Saussure, 1852)
H. melancholicus Schrottky, 1909
H. molinae (Saussure, 1851)
H. nigricornis Rohwer, 1913
H. obscuripennis (Spinosa, 1851)
H. oresbios Willink, 1992
H. porteri Bequard & Ruiz, 1941
H. punctatus Brèthes, 1903
H. ruficollis (Spinosa, 1851)
H. rufinodis (Buysson, 1913)
H. rufotegulatus (Zavattari, 1912)
H. tarabucensis (Saussure, 1856)
H. torresi Willink, 1970
H. tuberculiventris (Spinosa, 1851)
H. vardyi Giordani Soika, 1973
H. vespiformis (Haliday, 1837)
H. vestitus Saussure, 1856
H. villosus (Saussure, 1852)

References

Fauna of Chile
Potter wasps
Hymenoptera of South America
Taxa named by Henri Louis Frédéric de Saussure
Hymenoptera genera